The 1919 University of Utah football team was an American football team that represented the University of Utah in the Rocky Mountain Conference (RMC) during the 1919 college football season. In their first season under head coach Thomas M. Fitzpatrick, Utah compiled an overall record of 5–1 with a mark of 4–1 in conference play and outscored opponents by a total of 151 to 62.

Schedule

References

University of Utah
Utah Utes football seasons
University of Utah football